The Loktantrik Samajwadi Party, Nepal, is the sixth largest political party in Nepal. The party was officially registered at Election Commission, Nepal on 18 August 2021. Mahantha Thakur is the president of the new party. The party was formed after split in PSP-N to join KP Oli led government. Currently, the party stands as the fourth largest party of Madhesh province after Nepali Congress, CPN (UML) and Janata Samajbadi respectively.

As of August 2022, the party is a junior ally in the Nepali Congress-led Deuba government along with CPN (Maoist Centre), PSP-N, and CPN (Unified Socialist). The party's election symbol is a bicycle.

History

Registration 

The President of Nepal issued the second ordinance to amend the Political Parties Act on 18 August 2021. This opened the way to formalize the splits inside the dispute between two factions of Janata Samajbadi Party, Nepal. The faction of party led by Mahantha Thakur, which had a long dispute with party chairman Upendra Yadav, registered their party with the Election Commission. At the time of the launch, the Janata Samajbadi Party, Nepal (Loktantrik) claimed to have 15 members in the two national houses of parliament.

A Central Committee with 24 members was announced as well.

MCC Compact 
Though outside the government, the party made a decision to vote in support of getting the MCC passed. It reported that it's would vote in acceptance if tabled in parliament. Senior leader Laxman Lal Karna said the party was clear to vote for MCC as it was a grant.

The party president Mahantha Thakur asked, "Why are the people against MCC silent on BRI?" targeting the communist parties in ruling collision except Nepali Congress. He added that communists had always spoke in opposition to projects of national interest except the Kodari highway project. He added their dual nature was just for personal profit in elections.

First local election 
The party went split just ahead of local elections forming Nagrik Unmukti Party in western terai and Terai Madhesh Loktantrik Party in eastern terai. This caused a huge loss to party. The party was clean swept from Dhanusha district, Siraha district and Tharuhath region. The party was limited to fourth largest party of Madhesh province winning just 15 local levels from among 753 compared to 25 won by Rastriya Janata Party in 2017. Nepali Congress emerged as single largest party of Madhesh province for second consecutive term while CPN (UML) emerged as second and Janta Samajbadi was limited to third position. 

The party received only 2.1 percent popular vote share throughout the country while 3 percent was the least vote to be obtained for remaining as a national party and getting a proportional seat. This emerged as a matter of silent emergency within the party.

Alliance talks 
In the mid of March, the party started talks with Nepali Congress for a possible long term alliance between the two parties. Party chairman revealed this in a party meet in Janakpur on 22 March 2022. The party formed a committee for bilateral talks with Nepali Congress consisting Sharbendra Nath Sukla and Laxman Lal Karna in which party senior leader Sharat Singh Bhandari played vital role as mediator.

Bhandari had stood long for a Loktantrik alliance between democratic parties of Nepal. Both Loktantrik Samajwadi Party and Nepali Congress have some common ideologies including social democracy, democratic socialism. Many made a meaning that this was possible as majority leaders in the party were from Nepali Congress background except Rajendra Mahato who was near to KP Sharma Oli and CPN (UML).

It was reported that they had demanded 30% (10 seats) in House of Representatives among the 32 seats from Madhesh Province while fielding candidates on 36% (23 seats) of provincial assembly from altogether 64 seats in Madhesh Province. To this prime minister and NC president Sher Bahadur Deuba had reacted positive and formed a committee. Later Nepali Congress formed no alliance in local levels and single handedly became largest party of Madhesh province due to negligence of  Loktantrik Samajbadi Party leadership. 

Recently after the local elections, Thakur and Deuba have again met to discuss on the possible alliance in upcoming alliance. Recently, Upendra Yadav had given signs of joining hands with CPN (UML) after being limited to third in Madhesh. This talk is expected to give a certain pathway of future. 

On 5 June it was revealed that Deuba had offered two ministries and deputy speaker post to the party while party president Thakur had replied positive. As a result, it was reported from reliable sources that Deuba had asked former Janata Samajbadi to leave two ministries.

List of Members of Parliament

Members of Rastriya Sabha

Members of Pratinidhi Sabha

Series of split 
In the month of December 2021 and January 2022, the party has split twice.

Formation of Citizens' Liberation Party 

This split went when a group led by veteran tharu leader and Member of House of Representatives, Resham Lal Chaudhary. Chaudhary formed Nagrik Unmukti Party. The new party suggested that the party along with Janata Samajwadi Party, Nepal had forgotten their promise made to Tharuhath region. The  new party claimed that the party had forgotten the mandate of Tahruhat Movement to become power centric and authoritarian. This made a loss to party organization of Tharuhath region which once remained a strong uphold of the party. The predecessor party, Rastriya Janata Party Nepal had earned nearly one lakh proportional vote from the area making sole role in strengthening the party as a national party. The new party won four local levels of Kailali district and emerged as the single largest party in Kailali district from the recent local election.

Formation of Terai Madhesh Loktantrik Party 

The other group led by former MPs and central working committee member Brikhesh Chandra Lal and former member of Constituent Assembly, Bijay Kumar Singh separated from the party in mid February of 2022 to refound Terai Madhesh Loktantrik Party. Both of them were long time supporting hands of Mahantha Thakur but it was reported that they left party due to authoritarian nature which developed in Thakur while Mahato doing caste based politics. They suggested that Terai Madhesh centric parties had removed Madhesh/Terai from their name and this was against the mandate. This created a huge loss in party organization of Dhanusha and Mahottari district with leaders having strong hold in those districts.

In the document, it was claimed, "The unification or division for joining governments in the name of building greater political power did not lead to the existence of Madhes-centric parties. The leadership has started working with the Madhes-centric name. A regiona party is required to work as per the mandate. Naturally, the democratic Madhesi people are being covered by the Left." Lal, who had completed his two-year term in the National Assembly election two years ago, was not re-nominated but Mrigendra Singh Yadav was nominated as a candidate on the strength of money. At that time there had been a fierce protest. Though the party leaders told this made no difference to party and only two leaders left the party, Loktantrik samajbadi Party was clean swept from Dhanusha district while faced a huge loss in Mahottari and home constituency of Mahantha Thakur where the party won only one of the four local levels. On the other hand, Terai Madhesh Loktantrik Party won ward chairs in Janakpur and local level chair in Mahottari rural municipality from the recent local election.

Before election 
A number of former MP and MLA left the party before and a majority of them joined back Nepali Congress. The party's chief whip Umashankar Argariya left the party to join CPN (UML) while the party's whip and former minister Chanda Chaudhary joined Nepali Congress ruling that no regional party could make any change in socio economic development of Madhesh.

List of breakaway parties

Ideology 
Ideologically, Democratic Socialist Party is near to Nepali Congress while majority of leaders were  formerly Congress at different point of time specially before the 2006 Madhesh Movement. Party president Mahantha Thakur and senior leader Sharat Singh Bhandari were popular congress men at a time while Thakur was treasurer and head of party disciplinary department before he left the party. They were elected several times to House of Representatives on the party ticket.

Democratic Socialist Party follows the norms of social democracy, democratic socialism, identity and Madhesi rights.

Electoral performance

General election

Provincial election

Leadership

Chairmen 

 Mahantha Thakur (2021–present)

See also 

 Nepali Congress, Madhesh Province 
 Hridayesh Tripathi
 2021 split in the People's Socialist Party, Nepal
 Terai Madhesh Loktantrik Party 
 Second Oli Cabinet
 2022 Provincial Assembly of Madhesh Province election

References 

Political parties established in 2021
Socialism in Nepal
Social democratic parties in Nepal
2021 establishments in Nepal